This is a list of entertainers known to have performed in blackface makeup, whether in a minstrel show, as satire or historical depiction of such roles, or in a portrayal of a character using makeup as a racial disguise, for whatever reason.

A–C
 Roy Acuff, country music singer, performed in blackface in 1930s-40s traveling medicine shows
 Scarlet Adams
 Julie Andrews, in the 1964 film Mary Poppins
 Anne of Denmark, Queen of England, Scotland and Ireland, in The Masque of Blackness
 Fred Armisen, impersonating U.S. President Barack Obama on Saturday Night Live in 2008 and 2009
 Louis Armstrong, as Zulu King during 1949's Mardi Gras in New Orleans
 Clarence Ashley, 1910s-1940s singer and blackface comedian in traveling medicine shows
 Ant and Dec, in old Saturday Night Takeway sketches
 Fred Astaire, in Swing Time (1936) and in Easter Parade (1948)
Gene Autry
 Dan Aykroyd, in Trading Places (1983)
 David Baddiel, while portraying Jason Lee on a 1995 episode of Fantasy Football League
 Rita Baga
 Marcus "Buff" Bagwell, while performing for World Championship Wrestling
 Fay Bainter, as Topsy in a 1933 production of Uncle Tom's Cabin
Milt G. Barlow, 19th-century American minstrel
 Ethel Barrymore, in the 1930 play Scarlet Sister Mary 
 Billy Barty, in Roman Scandals (1933) and Rabbit Test (1978)
 Jack Black, in Be Kind Rewind (2008)
 Sergei Bondarchuk, in Othello (1956)
 John Boulter,  lead singer of the long-running Black and White Minstrel Show on the BBC
 Zach Braff, in the Scrubs episodes "My Friend the Doctor" and "My Chopped Liver"
 Frank Brower, 1840s-1860s minstrel performer
 Bugs Bunny, in the 1942 cartoon Fresh Hare
 George Burns
 Butterbeans and Susie
 Eddie Cantor, 1912-1927 performances in vaudeville and Ziegfeld Follies
 Judy Carne, in a 1969 episode of Rowan & Martin's Laugh-In
Graham Chapman
 Dave Chappelle, in a 2006 episode of Chappelle's Show
 George Christy, born George Harrington but became a star with Christy's Minstrels in the 1840s
 Charles Correll
 Bing Crosby, in Dream House (1932), Mississippi (1935), Road to Singapore (1940), Holiday Inn (1942), Dixie (1943), and Here Come the Waves (1944)
 Billy Crystal, in the "Negro Leagues" skit on Saturday Night Live in 1984 and whenever impersonating Sammy Davis Jr., including at the 84th Academy Awards.

D–G
Ted Danson, at a 1993 Friars Club roast of his then-girlfriend Whoopi Goldberg
Tommy Davidson in the 2000 film Bamboozled
 Sammy Davis, Jr. in Ocean's Eleven (1960)
 Shane Dawson, YouTuber, actor, and comedian
 Neil Diamond in The Jazz Singer
 Thomas Dilward, 1850s-1870s dwarf minstrel performer
George Washington Dixon, 1820s-1830s stage performer
 Lew Dockstader, 1870s-1900s minstrel performer
 Roma Downey in an episode of the television series Touched By An Angel entitled “Black Like Monica”, the character is turned black to better empathize with a community dealing with racial tensions.
Robert Downey Jr. in the 2008 film Tropic Thunder
Drake, on the cover of Pusha-T's single "The Story of Adidon"
Jimmy Durante
Harry Enfield, impersonating Nelson Mandela in the television show Harry & Paul.
The Ethiopian Serenaders were a Boston troupe which performed at the White House in 1844 and then toured Britain.
Jimmy Fallon, impersonating Chris Rock on Saturday Night Live
 Edwin Forrest
 Dai Francis, lead singer of the long-running Black and White Minstrel Show on the BBC
 Judy Garland in Babes in Arms
 George Givot, in the play The Constant Sinner (1931) 
 Freeman Gosden
 Billy Gould (1869-1950)
 Savion Glover in the 2000 film Bamboozled

H–L
 Sam Hague
 Masatoshi Hamada, dressed in blackface as Eddie Murphy from the film Beverly Hills Cop for the 2017 New Year's Eve special of Downtown no Gaki no Tsukai ya Arahende!!
 Jon Hamm on an episode of 30 Rock
 Goldie Hawn, in a 1969 episode of Rowan & Martin's Laugh-In
 Bob Height
 Charles Hicks
 Ernest Hogan
 C. Thomas Howell in the 1986 movie Soul Man
 William A. Huntley Starting 1860. Moved to whiteface in mid-1880s.
 George Jessel 
 Al Jolson
 Louis Jordan
 Buster Keaton, in vaudeville in the short film Neighbors (1920), possibly with satiric intent: he alternates in and out of blackface, receiving a very different reaction from a policeman; also in The Playhouse (1921) and College (1927)
 Billy Kersands, 1880s-1900s minstrel performer
 Jimmy Kimmel, impersonating Karl Malone and Oprah Winfrey on The Man Show Jane Krakowski twice on 30 Rock
 Cosmo Kramer
 Wallace King, 1880s minstrel performer
 Jennie Lee, in the 1915 film The Birth of a Nation Francis Leon, 1870s-80s minstrel performer
 Eddie Leonard, 1890s-1930s minstrel performer, "last of the great minstrels"
 Paul Levesque
 Walter Long, in the 1915 film The Birth of a NationSophia Loren in Aida (1953)
 Peter Lorre, in the play Weisse Fracht Matt Lucas, multiple characters in Little Britain,  Precious Little in Come Fly with Me Sam Lucas, 1870s minstrel performer

M–R
 Jenna Marbles, impersonating Nicki Minaj in a later removed 2011 Youtube video
 Pigmeat Markham, performer in 1920s-1950s traveling shows, as well as The Ed Sullivan Show and Rowan & Martin's Laugh-In Joni Mitchell appeared as black dandy, Art Nouveau, at parties and on the cover of Don Juan's Reckless Daughter Mickey Mouse in the 1933 cartoon Mickey's Mellerdrammer Emmett Miller, an important influence on early country stars like Jimmie Rodgers, Bob Wills
 Flournoy E. Miller
 Irvin C. Miller
 Clayton McMichen
 Bill Monroe
Moran and Mack
 Herbert Wassell Nadal (1873-1957)
Cornelius J. O'Brien (1869-1954)
Laurence Olivier in Othello (1965)
 Richard Pelham
Robert Webb
Thomas D. Rice
 Jimmie Rodgers
Mickey Rooney in Babes in Arms (1939)
 Benny Rubin

S–Z
 Harry Scott of the comedy duo Scott and Whaley, an African American act working in Britain.
 Ramblin' Tommy Scott
 Sarah Silverman
 Frank Sinatra, in the Major Bowes short The Big Minstrel (1935) and Ocean's Eleven (1960)
 Grace Slick, The Smothers Brothers Comedy Hour (1968) and Teen Set magazine (1969)
 Bessie Smith
 Hobart Smith
 Mel Smith in season 2, episode 4, of Not the Nine O'Clock News (sketch "Gone With The Wind", april 1980)
 Howard Stern in a series of 1991 skits as Clarence Thomas and in a 1993 New Year's Eve special
 Bert Swor (1878-1943)
 Shirley Temple in The Littlest Rebel Frank Tinney, in vaudeville and Broadway musical comedies
 The Three Stooges
 Sophie Tucker
 Tracey Ullman, in a 1989 episode of The Tracey Ullman Show Ben Vereen, as a part of the 1981 inaugural celebrations for US President Ronald Reagan
 Vladimir Vysotsky, as Abram Gannibal in How Czar Peter the Great Married Off His Moor David Walliams, as a minstrel, and as character Desiree Devere in Little Britain George Walker
 Sean Waltman
 Betty White, in The Golden Girls Billy Whitlock
 Gene Wilder in Silver Streak Barney Williams
 Bert Williams
 Hank Williams
 Slim Williams
 Bob Wills
 Tom Wilson
 Jane Withers in Can This Be Dixie? Jo Anne Worley, in a 1969 episode of Rowan & Martin's Laugh-In''

See also
 Examples of yellowface

External links
  Kake Walk at UVM digital collection, Center for Digital Initiatives, University of Vermont Libraries

References

Blackface minstrel performers
Blackface